Lu Yu-wen (1926–October 1999) was a Taiwanese politician. He served as Minister of Justice from 1989 to 1993. Lu was later named Vice President of the Judicial Yuan, serving from 1993 to 1998. He died in 1999 due to lung cancer. He is survived by a son and three daughters, all born to his first wife, who had died in 1994.

References

Taiwanese Presidents of the Judicial Yuan
Taiwanese Ministers of Justice
1999 deaths
1926 births
Deaths from lung cancer
Deaths from cancer in Taiwan